Margaret Tobin may refer to:
Birth name of Margaret Brown (1867-1932), also known as The Unsinkable Molly Brown, American socialite, philanthropist, activist; survivor of RMS Titanic
 Dr. Margaret Julia Tobin (1952–2002), psychiatrist, medical administrator, former head of government mental health services in South Australia, and murder victim